Desierto de Atacama Airport  is an airport serving the region around Copiapó, the capital of the Atacama Region of Chile.

Opened in February 2005, the airport replaced the smaller Chamonate Airport near the city, which was unable to increase its capacity and could not handle larger narrow-body planes such as the Airbus A320 and Boeing 737-800.

Airlines and destinations

See also

Transport in Chile
List of airports in Chile

References

External links
Desierto de Atacama at OurAirports

Desierto de Atacama Airport at FallingRain

 Airport record for Aeropuerto Desierto de Atacama at Landings.com

Airports in Atacama Region
Atacama Desert